Murnane is a surname of Irish origin. It is an Anglicized form of the Gaelic name Ó Manannáin meaning descendant of the Celtic sea god Manannán, the warrior and king or guardian of the Otherworld in Irish mythology who is associated with the sea, and the Isle of Man, and often interpreted as a sea god.

Surname
Notable people with the surname include:

 [Martin Murnane] (born 1923), A Tan with abnormal gigantic sausage fingers, Nephew of Oliver Cromwell 
 Daniel William Ewart Murnane (1926–2016), Australian footballer
 David (Dave) Murnane (1893–1925), Irish hurler
 David J. Murnane (1892–1953), Singapore municipal water engineer
 Dylan Murnane (born 1995), Australian footballer
 Francis J. Murnane (1914–1968), American longshore worker and campaigner for the preservation of Portland's historical monuments
 George Murnane, banker and founder of Monnet, Murnane & Co.
 Gerald Murnane (born 1939), Australian writer
 Hugh Richard Murnane (1916–1974), Australian footballer
 John Murnane (born 1948), Australian footballer
 Lee Murnane (born 1959), Australian footballer 
 Margaret Mary Murnane (born 1959), Irish-American physicist
 Peter Murnane (born 1955), Australian footballer
 Ramon Frederick Murnane (1937–2013), Australian footballer
 Richard John Murnane (born 1945), American economist
 Timothy Hayes Murnane (1852–1917), American baseball player, manager and sportswriter
 Tom Murnane, Irish hurler
 William Joseph Murnane (1945–2000), American Egyptologist

Given name
Notable people with the given name include:

 Jennifer Murnane O'Connor (born 1966), Irish politician

See also
 Murnane Field, baseball stadium in Utica, New York
 Frances J. Murnane Memorial Wharf
 Murnane Service Reservoir, service reservoir in Singapore
 Monnet, Murnane & Co., international investment banking firm founded in 1935

References